This is a list of the presidents of the University of Tulsa.

Presidents

References

Tulsa